The Mid-Eastern Wrestling Federation (MEWF) Mid-Atlantic Heavyweight Championship was the second highest ranking singles title in the Mid-Eastern Wrestling Federation, one of three in the promotion.

The title was created when "Hollywood" Bob Starr defeated C.C. Danger at an event held in Gaithersburg, Maryland on March 6, 1993. In 2003, the title was merged with the MCW Rage Television Championship when Maryland Championship Wrestling held its final show as an interpromtional event with the Mid-Eastern Wrestling Federation creating the MEWF Unified Mid-Atlantic Heavyweight Championship.

The championship has been known as:
MEWF Mid-Atlantic Heavyweight Championship (1993 – 2003) 
MEWF Unified Mid-Atlantic Heavyweight Championship (2003 – 2004)

There have been a total of 31 recognized champions who have had a combined 45 official reigns.

Title history

References

United States regional professional wrestling championships